Kiowa National Grassland is a National Grassland, located in northeastern New Mexico. The southwestern Great Plains grassland includes prairie and part of the Canadian River Canyon.

Sections
It is located in two non-adjacent units of northeastern New Mexico. The western unit is located in northwestern Harding, eastern Mora, and southeastern Colfax counties. The smaller eastern unit is located in eastern Union County, on the border with Oklahoma and Texas.

The grassland is administered by the U.S. Forest Service together with the Cibola National Forest and the Black Kettle, McClellan Creek, and Rita Blanca National Grasslands, from common headquarters located in Albuquerque, New Mexico. There are local ranger district offices located in Clayton.

Communities
The community of Mills lies within the western unit of the Kiowa National Grassland. Clayton is the nearest town to the eastern unit of the Grassland.

Description
Both units of the National Grassland consist of a patchwork quilt of public land interspaced with private land. Annual precipitation is about  throughout the Grassland with July and August the wettest months and January and February the driest.

Semi-arid steppe grassland (shortgrass prairie) is the most common vegetation, covering 79 percent of the Grassland (including the adjacent Rita Blanca National Grassland). Ten percent of the land is covered with Pinyon – Juniper woodland, almost entirely in the western sector. A few stands of Ponderosa Pine are found in the Canadian River Canyon in the western sector. Nine percent of vegetative cover is Sand Sagebrush and one percent is Cottonwood and Willow riparian forest.  The Canadian River is the only permanent stream.  Playa lakes (shallow lakes which hold rainwater part of the year) are commonly found.

Nearly all of the land in the Kiowa National Grassland is leased to ranchers for grazing cattle which is the main economic activity in the region.

Recreation

Eastern Unit
 northeast of Clayton is McNees Crossing, a reliable source of water on the Santa Fe Trail.  In 1828, two young traders, Robert McNees and Daniel Munro, were killed here by Native Americans.  In 1831, the first celebration in New Mexico on Independence Day took place at McNees Crossing.   Although on private property, a short trail leads to the crossing of Corrumpa Creek and an historical marker.   north of Clayton is a  section of the Santa Fe Trail which is open for walking and horseback riding. The trail is marked by rock posts.  The ruts of wagons that passed this way in the nineteenth century are still present.

Western Unit
About  of the red-rock, well-vegetated canyon are in the National Grassland. A primitive campground is on the rim. A road down into the canyon is traversable by foot, horseback, or high-clearance vehicles. On the canyon floor are the ruins of the homestead of Melvin Mills who had an apple orchard and a home here in the early 1900s. The area is rich in wildlife including introduced Barbary Sheep which flourish among the cliffs. The Canadian River has a variety of sport fishes including Largemouth Bass and Channel Catfish.

A wilderness area encompassing  was proposed in 2008 for the Cimarron River Canyon.  The proposal would preserve the pristine state of about eight miles of the canyon.  Fishing, hunting, and non-motorized travel would be permitted in the wilderness area.

See also
 List of protected grasslands of North America
 Grasslands of the Great Plains (U.S.)
 Native grasses of the Great Plains region

References

External links

Kiowa and Rita Blanca National Grasslands

National Grasslands of the United States
Grasslands of the North American Great Plains
Cibola National Forest
Natural history of New Mexico
Protected areas of Colfax County, New Mexico
Protected areas of Harding County, New Mexico
Protected areas of Mora County, New Mexico
Protected areas established in 1960
U.S. Route 56
U.S. Route 64
Grasslands of New Mexico
1960 establishments in New Mexico